This is a list of United Nations Security Council Resolutions 601 to 700 adopted between 30 October 1987 and 17 June 1991.

See also 
 Lists of United Nations Security Council resolutions
 List of United Nations Security Council Resolutions 501 to 600
 List of United Nations Security Council Resolutions 701 to 800

0601